Room Noises is the first full-length album of the band Eisley.  It was released on February 8, 2005 on Reprise Records.  The album was placed at  9 among Paste magazine's top albums of 2005. The album had three singles: "Memories", "Telescope Eyes", and "I Wasn't Prepared".  Music videos were made for each single, as well as "Marvelous Things".

Track listing

Charts

Release 
Early promotional copies of this album included a remixed bonus track "Lost At Sea" at the end of the album. The band later decided to drop the bonus track from the official release. It later appeared on an Urban Outfitters compilation CD and on a radio promotional EP alongside "Telescope Eyes", "I Wasn't Prepared", and "Golly Sandra".

Warner Brothers originally pressed only 1000 copies of Room Noises on vinyl.

Performance credits
Sherri DuPree – lead vocals, guitar
Stacy DuPree – keyboards, vocals, and guitar
Chauntelle DuPree – guitar
Weston DuPree – drums
Jonathan Wilson – bass guitar
Elijah Thomson – bass guitar
Casey Prestwood – steel guitar
Eddie Harbour – hand clapping

Technical credits 
Brian Gardner – mastering
Rob Schnapf – producer
Rob Cavallo – producer
Aaron Sprinkle – producer
Doug Boehm – engineer
John Shanks – engineer
Eisley – engineer
Doug Mcean – engineer

References 

Eisley albums
2005 albums
Albums produced by Rob Schnapf
Albums produced by John Shanks
Albums produced by Rob Cavallo
Albums produced by Aaron Sprinkle